The Southern Illinoisan is a daily newspaper based in Carbondale, Illinois, known locally as  "The Southern." As of October 2014, it has a daily circulation of 21,270, and a Sunday circulation of 26,958. It is one of the major regional newspaper and media services for southern Illinois.

History
The Southern Illinoisan was created in 1947 when Lindsay-Schaub Newspapers of Decatur, Illinois, purchased three area newspapers—the Daily Free Press of Carbondale, the Murphysboro Daily Independent and the Herrin Daily Journal—and merged them into a single publication. Lee Enterprises purchased the Southern Illinoisan and other Lindsay-Schaub papers in 1979.

References

Newspapers published in Illinois
Carbondale, Illinois
Companies based in Jackson County, Illinois
Lee Enterprises publications